Here I Am to Worship is an album of Christian music by singer-songwriter Tim Hughes.

Track listing
All songs written by Tim Hughes, except where noted.

Personnel 
 Tim Hughes – lead and backing vocals, additional guitars
 Jason Halbert – keyboards, organ, programming 
 Carl Marsh – programming, additional strings
 George Cocchini – acoustic guitar 
 Dwayne Larring – acoustic guitar, electric guitar 
 David Larring – bass
 Otto Price – bass 
 Rick May – drums 
 John Catchings – cello 
 Monisa Angell – viola 
 David Angell – second violin 
 David Davidson – first violin, string arrangements

Production 
 Jason Halbert – producer, engineer, mixing (3)
 Dwayne Larring – producer, additional engineer 
 Les Moir – executive producer 
 Mike Pilavachi – executive producer 
 Jim McCaslin – additional engineer
 Fred Paragano – mixing (1, 2, 4–11)
 Ken Love – mastering 
 Christiév Carothers – creative direction
 Jan Cook – art direction 
 Benji Peck – design 
 Kristin Barlowe – photography

Studios
 Recorded at Earful Sound (Brentwood, TN); The Refuge (Franklin, TN); Soul Survivor (Watford, UK).
 Mixed at Paragon Studios (Franklin, TN) and The Junction (Pasadena, CA).
 Mastered at MasterMix (Nashville, TN).

Tim Hughes albums
2001 debut albums